Eskett railway station was short-lived as a passenger station. it was built by the Whitehaven, Cleator and Egremont Railway to serve the hamlet of Eskett, near Frizington, Cumbria, England.

History
The line was one of the fruits of the rapid industrialisation of West Cumberland in the second half of the nineteenth century.

The station opened to passengers with the line from Moor Row to Rowrah on 12 February 1864.

The section of line through the station suffered subsidence problems so severe that the company built a deviation line to an alignment curving sharply and steeply to the west, including a new passenger station - Yeathouse. When the deviation and new station opened on 11 June 1872 the old alignment was severed north of Eskett station, which was converted to a goods depot. It remained as such until final closure in 1931.

The deviation made the line even more difficult to work for the rest of its existence.

See also

 Furness Railway
 Cleator and Workington Junction Railway

References

Sources

Further reading

External links
Map of the line with photos, via RAILSCOT
The station as Parkend House on overlain OS maps surveyed from 1898, via National Library of Scotland
The station, via Rail Map Online
The railways of Cumbria, via Cumbrian Railways Association
Photos of Cumbrian railways, via Cumbrian Railways Association
The railways of Cumbria, via Railways_of_Cumbria
Cumbrian Industrial History, via Cumbria Industrial History Society
A video tour-de-force of the region's closed lines, via cumbriafilmarchive
The station on its very own residual branch line, via railwaycodes

Disused railway stations in Cumbria
1973 disestablishments in England
Railway stations in Great Britain opened in 1864
Railway stations in Great Britain closed in 1872
1864 establishments in England